Richard Cresson Harlow (October 19, 1889 – February 19, 1962) was an American football player and coach, as well as an oologist. Harlow served as the head coach at Pennsylvania State University (1915–1917), Colgate University (1922–1925), Western Maryland College (1926–1934), and Harvard University (1935–1942, 1945–1947). He is credited with pioneering modern defensive schemes. Often fielding undersized teams, Harlow coordinated stunts to avoid blockers, rather than trying to overpower them. His offensive style utilized shifts, reverses, and lateral passes. Harlow was inducted into the College Football Hall of Fame as a coach in 1954.

Early years
A native of Philadelphia, Harlow attended Pennsylvania State University, where he played football for the Nittany Lions, under Bill and Jack Hollenback. As a tackle, Harlow distinguished himself during the 1910 and 1911 seasons. In the latter year, the team went undefeated and won the national title. A two-year letterman, he also was a member of the baseball and track and field teams, as well as the Phi Sigma Kappa fraternity.

Coaching career

Penn State
Upon graduation from Penn State, Harlow remained with the Nittany Lions as an assistant football coach for three seasons, under his former coach Bill Hollenback. Harlow succeeded him as head coach in 1915, and hired Lawrence Whitney as an assistant. After compiling a combined 20–8 record in three seasons, Harlow entered the United States Army in 1918, and was stationed at Virginia Polytechnic Institute and State University, where he was an assistant coach for Charles A. Bernier. After an honorable discharge, Harlow returned to Penn State in the following year, again as an assistant, but this time under coach Hugo Bezdek. Harlow also became the boxing coach at that time.

Colgate
Harlow left Penn State to become the 20th head coach at Colgate University from 1922 to 1925, succeeding Ellery Huntington Jr. For the first two seasons, Harlow hired Punk Berryman as assistant. Harlow coached the team to a 55–0 victory over Niagara University, where players refused to tackle any Colgate players, leading to many scores. Harlow's overall coaching record at Colgate was 24–9–3.

Western Maryland
Harlow moved from Colgate to become the head coach at Western Maryland College from 1926 to 1934, succeeding Ken Shroyer. There, Harlow coached the Green Terror to a 60–13–7 record with three undefeated seasons. In 1934 Western Maryland was invited to play in the inguinal Orange Bowl.  Seeing it as not much of a challenge; Harlow declined to have his players play in then more prestigious East–West Shrine Game. In Orange Bowl, Bucknell, who lost to the Green Terror early that season, beat the Miami Hurricanes.

Harlow had many great players such as Eugene "Stoney" Willis, who threw the first shovel pass against Boston College in 1932, and Bill Shepherd, who was considered to be one of the best running backs in the country in the early 1930s, starring the East West shrine game in 1934 behind Michigan center Gerald Ford.  At Western Maryland, Harlow also coached Rip Engle.  He had a great influence on Engle's career, and they remained good friends for many years. Harlow said that his "biggest thrill" came from those games where he beat Bosten College and Bucknell by such a lopsided margin.

Harvard
In 1935, Harlow became the first non-alumnus ever to coach at Harvard. The job was initially offered to Clark Shaughnessy, but was turned down. Harlow's assistant coaches immediately became Henry Lamar and Skip Stahley. Lamar took over as head coach while Harlow served in the United States Navy during World War II. When Harlow returned, Lamar went back to being an assistant. From 1938 to 1946, Lyal Clark also served as an assistant. At Harvard, Harlow was voted Coach of the Year in 1936, and a year later, was chosen as the Ivy League Coach of the Year. He retired in 1947 with a lifetime record of 149–69–17, and was succeeded by Arthur Valpey. Harlow was named to the College Football Hall of Fame in 1954.

Oology career
Harlow was an expert in oology, the study of birds' eggs. In 1939, he was named curator of oology at the Harvard's Museum of Comparative Zoology, and he remained in that position until 1954.

Head coaching record

See also
List of college football head coaches with non-consecutive tenure
List of Phi Sigma Kappa brothers
List of presidents of the American Football Coaches Association

References

External links

1889 births
1962 deaths
20th-century American zoologists
American boxing trainers
American football tackles
Colgate Raiders football coaches
Harvard Crimson football coaches
McDaniel Green Terror football coaches
Penn State Nittany Lions baseball players
Penn State Nittany Lions football coaches
Penn State Nittany Lions football players
Penn State Nittany Lions men's track and field athletes
Virginia Tech Hokies football coaches
Penn State Nittany Lions boxing coaches
College Football Hall of Fame inductees
United States Army personnel of World War I
Oologists
Coaches of American football from Pennsylvania
Players of American football from Philadelphia
Baseball players from Philadelphia
Track and field athletes from Philadelphia